Wolle Chekol (1941 – 2005) was an Ethiopian statesman whose positions included Minister of Finance, Minister of Foreign Trade, and Deputy Prime Minister. He was born in Gojjam, where he completed his elementary and secondary education. He earned his BA degree in economics from Haile Selassie I University, Addis Ababa with distinction, and later earned an MA in Economics from the Center for Development Economics, Massachusetts, United States.

Government positions held
Deputy Prime Minister of Ethiopia (1989–1991)
Minister, Ministry of Finance (1986–1988)
Minister, Ministry of Foreign Trade (1979–1987)
Head, Foreign Economic Relations, National Central Planning Office
Head, Economic Relations Department, Ministry of Foreign Affairs
Served as senior expert in the development commission of Ethiopia
Member of the Shengo.

Bilateral functions (1970-1991)
Ethio-Italian Economic and Technical Commission, Co-chairman
Ethio-Chinese Economic and Technical Commission, Co-chairman
Ethio-Yemen Economic and Technical Commission, Co-chairman
Ethio-Djibouti Economic and Technical Commission, Co-chairman
Ethio-Yugoslav Economic and Technical Commission, Co-chairman
Ethio-Czechoslovakian Economic and Technical Commission, Co-chairman
Ethio-USSR Economic and Technical Commission, Co-chairman

Multilateral functions (1970-1991)
Africa Group vice chairman at the 1976 United Nations Conference on Trade and Development (UNCTAD)
Africa Group chairman at the 6th United Nations Conference on Trade
Africa Group Chairman at the Group of 77 (G77) Conferences
Chairman, African Ministers of Trade
Chairman, African Ministers of Finance
Chaired various international conferences at the United Nations Economic Commission for Africa (UNECA).

Private business
General Manager, Micro and Small Enterprise Development Program (MSEDP) Ethiopia
Founding Partner and Deputy General Manager, Afroconsult PLC, Ethiopia
Founding Partner and Deputy General Manager Afroconsult PLC

References

External links
http://www.chekol.info/
http://www.goldmercuryaward.org/laureates/wolle-chekol/
Adamu Mengistie, MS Thesis, Bahir Dar University, Ethiopia
[ http://www.npc.gov.cn/zgrdw/englishnpc/Special4/2008-11/03/content_1456444.htm Bilateral political relations between China and Ethiopia]
AP 1989 Reshuffle
Ministry of Finance, Ethiopia
Addis 1979

1941 births
2005 deaths
Finance ministers of Ethiopia
Government ministers of Ethiopia
Addis Ababa University alumni
Ethiopian economists
20th-century Ethiopian politicians